"For the Thrashers" is a four track 12" promotional single sampler by the funk rock band Red Hot Chili Peppers in 1989 to promote their then forthcoming fourth studio album, Mother's Milk. The single was never released for sale or intended for radio airplay and was issued as a sampler only to radio stations.

Track listing
 "Stone Cold Bush" – 3:04
 "Fire" – 2:01
 "Nobody Weird Like Me" – 3:50
 "Punk Rock Classic" – 1:47

Personnel
Anthony Kiedis – lead vocals
John Frusciante – guitar, backing vocals on tracks #1, #3, #4
Flea – bass, backing vocals
Chad Smith – drums on tracks #1, #3, #4
Hillel Slovak – guitar on track #2
Jack Irons – drums on track #2

References

Red Hot Chili Peppers songs
1989 singles
Songs written by Anthony Kiedis
Songs written by Flea (musician)
1989 songs
Songs written by John Frusciante
Songs written by Chad Smith